Amir Afsahaddin Hidayatullah Bey, better known by his pen name Hidayat, was a 15th-century Azerbaijani poet and statesman who served under the Aq Qoyunlus. His only surviving work is a divan (collection of short poems) in Azerbaijani.

Life 
Most of what is known about Hidayat's life comes from his poetry. It has been established that his real name was Afsahaddin Hidayatullah and that he lived in the second half of the 15th century. He served as an amir under Uzun Hasan in the Aq Qoyunlu state and was a Shia Muslim. Hidayat resided in Shiraz with Sultan-Khalil until he ascended to the throne in 1478 and then accompanied him to Tabriz when he came into power. However, when Ya'qub Beg took over later that year, Hidayat was sent to Iraq against his wishes. The precise date of his death is uncertain, but it is known that he passed away before December 1497.

Poetry 
The only known literary work attributed to him is his divan in Azerbaijani language, entitled "Dīvān-i Hidāyat". The majority of his poetry centred around themes of love and separation from a beloved. Additionally, he composed verses about heroism and war. His poetry is characterized by a fluid and simple language that dominates his work. Persian theologian Jalal al-Din Davani lauded his compositions and it is likely that he was regarded as a successful poet during his time.

References

Literature 

 
 
 
 

Azerbaijani poets
15th-century poets